Full Circle may refer to:

Geometry
 Turn (geometry), a unit of plane angle equal to 360°

Books
 Full Circle, a 1962 novel by Grace Lumpkin
 Full Circle, a 1982 memoir by Janet Baker
 Full Circle (novel), a 1984 novel by Danielle Steel
 Full Circle: The Moral Force of Unified Science, a 1972 book co-written and edited by Edward Haskell
 Full Circle (travel book), a 1997 companion book to the travel TV series, by Michael Palin
 Batman: Full Circle, a comic book
 Full Circle Magazine, a free-distribution on-line Ubuntu PDF magazine launched in 2007

Film, TV and theatre
 Full Circle (1935 film), a British film starring Garry Marsh
 Full Circle (1977 film) (also known as The Haunting of Julia), starring Mia Farrow
 Full Circle (1993 film), a Canadian documentary
 Full Circle (1996 film), a Cirque du Soleil documentary
 Full Circle (2008 film), a documentary about an Israeli submarine
 Full Circle, a 1996 TV film adapted from the novel Full Circle by Danielle Steel
 Full Circle (2012 film), a Chinese film directed by Zhang Yang

Television
 Full Circle (Doctor Who), a 1980 TV serial
 "Full Circle" (Stargate SG-1), a 2002 TV episode
 Full Circle (1960 TV series), a short-lived daytime TV serial starring Dyan Cannon and Jean Byron
 Full Circle (2013 TV series), a TV series by Audience Network
 "Full Circle", a Hercules: The Legendary Journeys episode
 "Full Circle", a Princess Gwenevere and the Jewel Riders episode
 "The Full Circle", an episode of the TV series Space: 1999
 Full Circle with Michael Palin, a 1997 travel TV series
 ESPN Full Circle, a televised sports event

Plays
 Full Circle (Melville play), a 1953 play by Alan Melville
 Full Circle, a 1956 play by Erich Maria Remarque
 Full Circle, a 1998 play by Charles L. Mee

Music
 Full circle ringing, a method of hanging (church) bells and ringing them in the "English tradition"
 Full Circle (group), a hip hop combined supergroup of Halal Gang and Prime Boys

Albums
 Full Circle (Loretta Lynn album), 2016 album by Loretta Lynn
 Full Circle (David Benoit album), 2006 album by David Benoit
 Full Circle (Boyz II Men album), 2002 album by Boyz II Men
 Full Circle (Chillinit album), 2020 album by Chillinit
 Full Circle (Creed album), 2009 album by Creed
 Full Circle (CTA album), 2007 album by CTA
 Full Circle (Holger Czukay, Jah Wobble and Jaki Liebezeit album), 1982 album by Holger Czukay, Jah Wobble and Jaki Liebezeit
 Full Circle (Barbara Dickson album), 2004 album by Barbara Dickson
 Full Circle (The Doors album), 1972 album by The Doors
 Full Circle (Dixie Dregs album), 1994 album by Dixie Dregs
 Full Circle (Drowning Pool album), 2007 album by Drowning Pool
 Full Circle (Eddie Palmieri album), 2018 album by Eddie Palmieri
 Full Circle (FireHouse album), 2011 album by FireHouse
 Full Circle (Hieroglyphics album), 2003 album and title track by Hieroglyphics
 Full Circle (Icehouse album), 1994 album by Icehouse
 Full Circle (Waylon Jennings album), 1988 album by Waylon Jennings
 Full Circle (Jim Jidhed album), 2003 album by Jim Jidhed and Tommy Denander
 Full Circle (Morgan Heritage album), 2005 album by Morgan Heritage
 Full Circle (Oliver album), 2017 album by Oliver
 Full Circle (Pennywise album), 1997 album by Pennywise
 Full Circle (The Quill album), 2011 album by The Quill
 Full Circle (Jimmie Ross album), 2010 album by Jimmie Ross
 Full Circle (Saga album), 1999 album by Saga
 Full Circle (Ravi Shankar album), 2001 album by Ravi Shankar
 Full Circle (Leon Thomas album), 1973 album by Leon Thomas
 Full Circle (Randy Travis album), 1996 album by Randy Travis
 Full Circle (Dottie West album), 1982 album by Dottie West
 Full Circle (Xzibit album), 2006 album by Xzibit
 Full Circle, a 2005 album by Birtles Shorrock Goble
 Full Circle, a 2004 album by Charlie Peacock
 Full Circle, a 1997 soundtrack album by Colin Towns
 Full Circle, a 2003 album by Dan Fogelberg
 Full Circle, a 2003 album by Dave Sinclair
 Full Circle, a 1998 album by DJ Dara
 Full Circle, a 2018 album by Eddie Palmieri
 Full Circle, a 1970 album by Forest
 Full Circle, a 1986 album by Frank Marino
 Full Circle, a 2016 album by Hælos
 Full Circle, a 1968 album by Ian & Sylvia
 Full Circle, a 2003 album by Holly Dunn
 Full Circle, a 1981 album by Rupert Holmes

Songs
 "Full Circle" (Five Finger Death Punch sonɡ), a 2020 song by Five Finger Death Punch
 "Full Circle", a song by Aerosmith on the album Nine Lives
 "Full Circle", a song by Company B on the album Company B
 "Full Circle", a song by Miley Cyrus on the album Breakout
 "Full Circle", a song by Half Moon Run on the album Dark Eyes
 "Full Circle", a song by Loreena McKennitt on the album The Mask and Mirror
 "Full Circle", a song by No Doubt on the album Everything in Time
 "Full Circle", a movement from the song "Octavarium" by Dream Theater
 "Full Circle Song" (aka "Full Circle"), a 1973 song by Gene Clark on the albums Roadmaster and Byrds
 "Full Circle", a song by Xavier Rudd on the album Spirit Bird
 "Full Circle", a song by Tenelle which represented American Samoa in the American Song Contest